Frederick Stanley Martin (April 25, 1794 – June 28, 1865) was a U.S. Representative from New York.

Biography
Born in West Haven, Vermont, Martin went to New Hartford, New York, in 1804 and attended the local schools.  He moved to Whitehall, New York, in 1810 and became employed in a mercantile establishment and later as a sailor.

He settled in Olean, New York, in the spring of 1818, ran a hotel, and also carried on a lumber business. From 1826 until 1833 he served in the state militia, and attained the rank of lieutenant colonel. He served as town supervisor of Olean in 1830, 1831, 1836, and 1838.

He was appointed postmaster of Olean on December 23, 1830, and served until November 14, 1839. In 1831 he started his own mercantile and dry goods firm, which he operated for 20 years before selling it to his son. He was appointed judge of the county court in January 1840 by Governor Seward and served for five years.

Beginning in the mid-1830s, Martin was a leading proponent of constructing the Genesee Valley Canal. He was a member of the New York State Senate (32nd D.) in 1848 and 1849; and of the New York State Assembly (Cattaraugus Co., 1st D.) in 1850.

Martin was elected as a Whig to the Thirty-second Congress (March 4, 1851 – March 3, 1853). After leaving Congress, he renewed his former business pursuits.

He died in Olean on June 28, 1865. He was originally interred at Oak Lawn Cemetery in Olean. On April 29, 1896 was reinterred at Mount View Cemetery in Olean.

Sources

1794 births
1865 deaths
Town supervisors in New York (state)
New York (state) postmasters
New York (state) state court judges
Members of the New York State Assembly
New York (state) state senators
Whig Party members of the United States House of Representatives from New York (state)
19th-century American politicians
People from West Haven, Vermont
People from New Hartford, New York
People from Olean, New York
Burials in New York (state)
19th-century American judges